Mohamed Camara (born 27 December 1981) is a Sierra Leonean former footballer. He spent one season with Russian side Fakel.

Career statistics

Club

Notes

References

1981 births
Living people
Sierra Leonean footballers
Association football midfielders
Russian Premier League players
FC Fakel Voronezh players
FC Dynamo Saint Petersburg players
Sierra Leonean expatriate footballers
Expatriate footballers in Russia